Princeton Meadows is an unincorporated community and census-designated place (CDP) located within Plainsboro Township, in Middlesex County, New Jersey, United States. As of the 2010 United States Census, the CDP's population was 13,834.

Geography
According to the United States Census Bureau, the CDP had a total area of 2.115 square miles (5.479 km2), including 2.077 square miles (5.380 km2) of land and 0.038 square miles (0.098 km2) of water (1.79%).

Demographics

Census 2010

The median value of owner-occupied housing units was $350,100, and 72.8% of housing units were in multi-unit structures.  The homeownership rate was 38.6%

Census 2000
As of the 2000 United States Census there were 13,436 people, 6,017 households, and 3,255 families living in the CDP. The population density was 2,390.6/km2 (6,187.2/mi2). There were 6,205 housing units at an average density of 1,104.0/km2 (2,857.3/mi2). The racial makeup of the CDP was 56.16% White, 9.64% African American, 0.13% Native American, 30.05% Asian, 1.71% from other races, and 2.31% from two or more races. Hispanic or Latino of any race were 5.27% of the population.

There were 6,017 households, out of which 32.4% had children under the age of 18 living with them, 44.7% were married couples living together, 7.5% had a female householder with no husband present, and 45.9% were non-families. 37.1% of all households were made up of individuals, and 1.2% had someone living alone who was 65 years of age or older. The average household size was 2.22 and the average family size was 3.06.

In the CDP the population was spread out, with 24.3% under the age of 18, 7.3% from 18 to 24, 49.0% from 25 to 44, 17.0% from 45 to 64, and 2.4% who were 65 years of age or older. The median age was 32 years. For every 100 females, there were 103.0 males. For every 100 females age 18 and over, there were 102.1 males.

The median income for a household in the CDP was $66,415, and the median income for a family was $80,134. Males had a median income of $57,000 versus $43,481 for females. The per capita income for the CDP was $36,654. About 1.4% of families and 3.4% of the population were below the poverty line, including 2.0% of those under age 18 and none of those age 65 or over.

References 

Census-designated places in Middlesex County, New Jersey
Plainsboro Township, New Jersey